Luynes is a village of the Bouches-du-Rhône département in southern France. It is located 4 km south of Aix-en-Provence at the intersection of the D7 and N8 roads. The village is perhaps best known for its prison and for its three international schools.  The Nécropole Nationale de Luynes is also located nearby.

Luynes is bordered by the Massif du Montaiguet, which expands to Gardanne and Aix en Provence. It comprises chalky plateaux bordered by cliffs, forests of pines and oaks, and crops areas. In 1979 and 2005 the area was devastated by bush fires. Following these incidents, garrigue is now covering a wide area.

Education
The private school Saint François d’assise is in Luynes.

 International Bilingual School of Provence
 Lycée International Georges Duby

Sport and Leisure 
In June 2011 Zinédine Zidane inaugurate his futsal sport complex: Z5. Z5 is also home to the gym Arène Aix.

Prison 
Bernard Tapie was incarcerated in this prison for 165 days in 1997 following the VA-OM matter.

References

External links
 Home page  (Archive)
 Commune of Luynes 

Aix-en-Provence
Villages in Provence-Alpes-Côte d'Azur